The Saro P.531 (or Saunders-Roe P.531) is a British all-metal five-seat helicopter designed and built by Saunders-Roe Limited (Saro).

Development
Design of the P.531 was started in November 1957 as a private venture improvement of the company's earlier Skeeter. The first prototypes were powered by a derated 325 shp Blackburn Turbomeca Turmo 600, a free turbine engine allowing clutchless transmission. The P.531 first flew on 20 July 1958. Three more developed P.531-0s followed and these were delivered to the Royal Navy/Fleet Air Arm for trials and familiarisation. Following evaluation by the Navy a batch of 30 developed aircraft were eventually ordered as the Westland Wasp.

Two militiarised P.531-2s were completed in 1959, powered by the Blackburn Nimbus and the de Havilland Gnome H1000 free-turbine engines, both derated to 635 hp now that the transmission tests had proved such powers acceptable. Like the Turmo installation, these engines were mounted, uncowled behind the cabin for easy servicing.  There were aerodynamic shape revisions and a floor extension to allow six, rather than five seats.  The vision was improved with perspex panels in the doors, tankage was increased and all-metal rotors introduced.  These modifications increased gross weight by 1,200 lb (544 kg).

Saro had an order for eight pre-production aircraft from the British Army′s Army Air Corps for evaluation and trials; these would have been known as the Saro Sprite, but the company was taken over by Westland Helicopters and the aircraft became the first Westland Scout A.H.1s.

Another P.531-2 was built for evaluation by the Indian government but following a lack of interest was re-worked as Scout standard for the Army Air Corps.

Variants

P.531
Prototype powered by the Turmo 600, one built.  Had a short tailplane for c.g. adjustment, though not always installed.
P.531-0
Three further prototypes with full scale tailplane, Turmo powered. All three were used by the Navy, with many deck landings; these flights fed into the later development of the Westland Wasp.
P.531-2
Militarised version for both Army and Navy use, powered by a slightly derated 635 hp (474 kW) Blackburn Nimbus free-turbine engine. Two built by Saro, the second initially powered by a de Havilland Gnome H.1000, derated to 635 hp.  It was later developed as the forerunner of the Westland Scout.

Operators

Army Air Corps
Fleet Air Arm

Aircraft on display

The second and third prototypes are held by the Fleet Air Arm Museum for display whilst one of the P.531-2's is on display at the Helicopter Museum, Weston-super-Mare.

Specifications (P.531, G-APNU)

See also

References
Notes

Bibliography

External links

"Saunders-Roe P.531" a 1958 Flight article

1950s British military utility aircraft
P.351
1950s British helicopters
Single-turbine helicopters
Aircraft first flown in 1958